Julia the Elder (30 October 39 BC – AD 14), known to her contemporaries as Julia Caesaris filia or Julia Augusti filia (Classical Latin: IVLIA•CAESARIS•FILIA or IVLIA•AVGVSTI•FILIA), was the daughter and only biological child of Augustus, the first Roman Emperor, and his second wife, Scribonia. Julia was also stepsister and second wife of the Emperor Tiberius; maternal grandmother of the Emperor Caligula and the Empress Agrippina the Younger; grandmother-in-law of the Emperor Claudius; and maternal great-grandmother of the Emperor Nero. Her epithet "the Elder" distinguishes her from her daughter, Julia the Younger.

Life

Early life

At the time of Julia's birth, 39 BC, Augustus had not yet received the title "Augustus" and was known as "Gaius Julius Caesar Divi Filius", though historians refer to him as "Octavian" until 27 BC, when Julia was 11. Octavian divorced Julia's mother on the day of her birth and took Julia from her soon thereafter. Octavian, in accordance with Roman custom, claimed complete parental control over her. She was sent to live with her stepmother Livia and when she was old enough learned how to be an aristocrat. Her education appears to have been strict and somewhat old-fashioned. Thus, in addition to her studies, Suetonius informs us, she was taught spinning and weaving. Macrobius mentions "her love of literature and considerable culture, a thing easy to come by in that household".

Julia's social life was severely controlled, and she was allowed to talk only to people whom her father had vetted. However, Octavian had a great affection for his daughter and made sure she had the best teachers available. Macrobius preserves a remark of Augustus: "There are two wayward daughters that I have to put up with: the Roman commonwealth and Julia."

In 37 BC, during Julia's early childhood, Octavian's friends Gaius Maecenas and Marcus Vipsanius Agrippa concluded an agreement with Octavian's great rival Mark Antony. It was sealed with an engagement: Antony's ten-year-old son Marcus Antonius Antyllus was to marry Julia, then two years old.

The engagement never led to marriage because civil war broke out. In 31 BC, at the Battle of Actium, Octavian and Agrippa defeated Antony and Cleopatra. In Alexandria, the defeated couple both committed suicide, and Octavian became sole ruler of the Roman Empire.

First marriage
As with most aristocratic Roman women of the period, expectations of Julia focused on marriage and on the resulting family alliances. Moreover, Augustus desired a male issue; as his only living child, Julia's duty would be to provide her father with grandsons whom he could adopt as his heirs.

In 25 BC, at the age of fourteen, Julia married her first cousin Marcellus, the son of her father's sister Octavia, who was some three years older than she. Augustus himself was not present for the wedding as he was fighting a war in Spain and had fallen ill. Instead, he commissioned Agrippa to preside over the ceremony and hold the festival in his absence.

The decision to marry Marcellus to Julia, and then Augustus's choice to raise Marcellus to the pontificate and curule aedileship, was perceived to be an indication that he would be Augustus's successor in power, despite his youth. This put him at odds with Agrippa, whom people believed would oppose Marcellus' accession to power; the apparent preference for Marcellus is allegedly the catalyst that led to Agrippa to withdraw to Mytilene, Greece.

However, Marcellus died in September 23 BC, when Julia was sixteen. The union produced no children.

Marriage to Agrippa

In 21 BC, having now reached the age of 18, Julia married Agrippa, a man from a modest family who had risen to become Augustus's most trusted general and friend. This step is said to have been taken partly on the advice of Maecenas, who in counseling him remarked: "You have made him so great that he must either become your son-in-law or be slain." Agrippa was nearly 25 years her elder; it was a typical arranged marriage, with Julia functioning as a pawn in her father's dynastic plans. There is from this period the report of an infidelity with one Sempronius Gracchus, with whom Julia allegedly had a lasting liaison (Tacitus describes him as "a persistent paramour"). This was the first of a series of alleged adulteries. According to Suetonius, Julia's marital status did not prevent her from conceiving a passion for Augustus' stepson, and thus her stepbrother, Tiberius, so it was widely rumoured.

The newlyweds lived in a villa in Rome that has since been excavated near the modern Farnesina in Trastevere. Agrippa and Julia's marriage resulted in five children: Gaius Caesar, Julia the Younger, Lucius Caesar, Agrippina the Elder (mother of Caligula), and Agrippa Postumus (a posthumous son). From June 20 BC to the spring of 18 BC, Agrippa was governor of Gaul, and it is likely that Julia followed him across the Alps. Shortly after their arrival, their first child Gaius was born, and in 19 BC, Julia gave birth to Vipsania Julia. After their return to Italy, a third child followed: a son named Lucius. In 17 BC, Augustus adopted the newborn Lucius and the three-year-old Gaius. He took care of their education personally. Although Agrippa died in 12 BC, Augustus did not adopt the third brother, Marcus Vipsanius Agrippa Posthumus, until AD 4, after the exile of Julia - and after the deaths of both Gaius and Lucius.

Nicolaus and Josephus mention that during Julia's marriage to Agrippa, she travelled to meet Agrippa where he was campaigning. She was caught up in a flash flood in Ilium (Troy), and almost drowned. Agrippa was furious, and in his anger he fined the locals 100,000 drachmae. The fine was a heavy blow but no one would face Agrippa to request an appeal. Only after Herod, king of Judaea, went to Agrippa to request a pardon did he withdraw the fine. In the spring of 16 BC, Agrippa and Julia started a tour through the eastern provinces, where they visited Herod. In October 14 BC, the couple traveled to Athens, where Julia gave birth to her fourth child, Agrippina.

After the winter, the family returned to Italy. Julia quickly became pregnant again, but her husband died suddenly in March 12 BC in Campania at the age of 51. He was buried in the Mausoleum of Augustus. Julia named the posthumous son Marcus in his honor. He was to be known as Agrippa Postumus. Immediately after the boy was born, and while Julia was still in mourning, Augustus had her betrothed and then remarried to Tiberius, her stepbrother.

Marriage to Tiberius
After the death of Agrippa, Augustus sought to promote his step-son Tiberius, believing that this would best serve his own dynastic interests. Tiberius married Julia (11 BC), but first had to divorce Vipsania Agrippina (daughter from a previous marriage of Agrippa), the woman he dearly loved. Suetonius alleges that Tiberius had a low opinion of Julia's character, while Tacitus claims that she disdained Tiberius as an unequal match and even sent his father a letter, written by Sempronius Gracchus, denouncing him. The marriage was thus blighted almost from the start, and the son that Julia bore him died in infancy. By 6 BC, when Tiberius departed for Rhodes, if not earlier, the couple had separated.

Scandal
Because Augustus was her legitimate father, having married her mother with conubium, Augustus had Patria Potestas over her. Patria Potestas lasted until the pater familias, Augustus, either died or emancipated his child. Marriage had no effect on Patria Potestas, unless it was manus marriage which was rare at this point in time.

As the daughter of Augustus, mother (now legally the sister) of two of his heirs, Lucius and Gaius, and wife of another, Tiberius, Julia's future seemed assured to all. Yet in 2 BC she was arrested for adultery and treason; Augustus sent her a letter in Tiberius' name declaring the marriage null and void (Tiberius was at this time on the island of Rhodes and unable to respond quickly). He also asserted in public that she had been plotting against his own life. Though at the time Augustus had been passing legislation to promote family values, collectively known as the Leges Iuliae, he likely knew of her intrigues with other men but hesitated for some time to accuse her. Several of Julia's supposed lovers were exiled, most notably Sempronius Gracchus, while Iullus Antonius (son of Mark Antony and Fulvia) was forced to commit suicide. Others have suggested that Julia's alleged paramours were members of her city clique, who wished to remove Tiberius from favour and replace him with Antonius. This would explain the letter, written by Gracchus, asking Augustus to allow Julia to divorce Tiberius.

Exile
Her mother, Scribonia, accompanied her into exile. She was allowed no visitor unless her father had given permission and had been informed of the stature, complexion, and even of any marks or scars upon his body.

Five years after her initial exile, around AD 4, Julia was moved to Rhegium on the mainland and Augustus appears to have granted her a peculium (property), a yearly income and permitted her to walk about the town. Despite these concessions, Augustus never forgave her nor ever allowed her to return to Rome. This choice appears to have been unpopular with the Roman people, who petitioned several times for her to be recalled. Julia's exile cast a long shadow over Augustus's remaining years. In AD 6, Julia's youngest son, Agrippa Postumus, was exiled for his growing unruliness. Then, in AD 8, her elder daughter Julia the Younger was exiled to Tremirus, likewise charged with adultery; it may also have been related to the attempted revolt by her husband Lucius Aemilius Paullus and one Plautius Rufus. It is said that at any mention of Julia or her two disgraced children, Augustus would remark of them: "If only I had never married, or had died childless", slightly misquoting Hector, in the Iliad. There is mention of at least one suppressed plot to take her from captivity; one Lucius Audasius and one Asinius Epicadus had planned to forcibly take her and her son Agrippa Postumus from where they were held and to the armies, presumably to stage a coup against Augustus.

Upon Augustus's death in AD 14, Tiberius ascended to the Principate. Despite having shown some sympathy towards Julia when she was initially exiled, he instead enforced harsher conditions upon her. He removed her dowry and yearly income, citing that Augustus had failed to make provisions for them in his will, and thus left her destitute. Furthermore, he denied her permission to leave her house or receive visitors.

Death and aftermath
Julia died in 14 AD, some time after Augustus's death. While it is generally agreed by contemporary historians that it was as a result of Tiberius's actions against her, the circumstances of her death are obscure. Dio Cassius indicates Tiberius had a direct hand in her death by imprisoning her until she died either from debility or starvation. Tacitus remarks that upon learning Postumus had been murdered, she succumbed to despair and her health slowly declined. Augustus had explicitly given instructions in his will that she should not be buried in his Mausoleum of Augustus.

Simultaneously, her alleged paramour Sempronius Gracchus, who had endured 14 years of exile on Cercina (Kerkenna) off the African coast, was executed either at Tiberius' instigation or on the independent initiative of L. Nonius Asprenas, proconsul of Africa.

Her daughter Julia died in AD 29, after 20 years of exile; like her mother, the younger Julia was forbidden by Augustus's will to be buried in his tomb.

Cultural depictions

In ancient literature 
Among contemporary writers, Julia is almost universally remembered for her flagrant and promiscuous conduct. Thus Marcus Velleius Paterculus (2.100) describes her as "tainted by luxury or lust", listing among her lovers Iullus Antonius, Quintius Crispinus, Appius Claudius, Sempronius Gracchus, and Cornelius Scipio. Seneca the Younger refers to "adulterers admitted in droves"; Pliny the Elder calls her an “exemplum licentiae” (NH 21.9). Dio Cassius mentions "revels and drinking parties by night in the Forum and even upon the Rostra" (Roman History 55.10). Seneca (De Beneficiis 6.32) tells us that the Rostra was the place where "her father had proposed a law against adultery", and yet now she had chosen the place for her "debaucheries". Seneca specifically mentions prostitution: "laying aside the role of adulteress, she there [in the Forum] sold her favours, and sought the right to every indulgence with even an unknown paramour." Modern historians discredit these representations as exaggerating Julia's behaviour.

Macrobius provides invaluable details of her witticisms and personality. Among the sassy ripostes he attributes to her is a retort to people's surprise that her children all resembled Agrippa - “I take on a passenger only when the ship’s hold is full.” On her character, he writes that Julia was extensively celebrated for her amiable, empathetic nature and studiousness despite her profligacy: "[S]he was abusing her standing as fortune’s darling, and her father’s, though in other respects she gained a great deal of credit for her love of literature and extensive learning... and her kindness, fellow-feeling, and lack of cruelty."

Sidonius Apollinaris, writing in the 5th century, was the first person to identify Julia as the figure Corinna in Ovid's Amores.

In popular culture

Literature

In Ben Jonson's comedy play, The Poetaster (1601), Julia is the romantic interest of Ovid. The play itself is commonly thought to be a parody on the literary scene at the time with Julia and Ovid performing a balcony scene similar to Romeo and Juliet.
Aphra Behn's satirical, heroic epistle poem, Ovid to Julia. A Letter (1685). The poem itself is a satire of John Sheffield, 1st Duke of Buckingham and Normanby, who allegedly courted the future Queen Anne and was exiled from court in 1682.
Charlotte-Antoinette de Bressay's epistolary novel, Lettres De Julie À Ovide Et D'ovide À Julie ("Letters from Julia, the Daughter of Augustus, to Ovid", 1753).
Robert Graves' novel, I, Claudius (1934). The titular character, Claudius, recounts that Julia was tricked by Livia into taking aphrodisiacs that increase her sexual appetite, leading to her affairs and ultimately her exile. Graves appears to have been largely influenced by Macrobius' account of Julia, with Claudius referring to her as "a decent, good hearted woman, though fond of pleasures and excitement, and the only one of my female relations who had a kindly word for me."
Taylor Caldwell's novel Dear and Glorious Physician (1958) portrays Julia as the unhappy wife of Tiberius and a seductress of Lucanus, the young evangelist Saint Luke.
In Elisabeth Dored's novel, Jeg elsket Tiberius ("I Loved Tiberius", 1959), Julia serves as the main character; it portrays Julia as innocent of all charges against her, both her affairs and modern historians' speculation of a plot.
Julia is one of the narrators of John Edward Williams' epistolary novel Augustus (1972). There are a number of contributions in her name, written as part of a diary she wrote while in exile in Pandateria reflecting on her father, her marriages, her relationships with her lovers and the restrictions on her as a prominent Roman matron.
Allan Massie's novel, Augustus (1986), depicts Julia very closely to the contemporary histories, with her engaging in affairs as a slight against her father's laws. Its follow-up, Tiberius (1991), invents an affair between Julia and Tiberius during her marriage to Marcellus.
In Edward Burton's novel Caesar's Daughter (1999), Julia is the titular character; it downplays her affairs with Iullus Antonius being her only lover and instead attributes Julia's exile to a failed coup to kill Tiberius.
Julia appears in the final novel in Colleen McCullough's Master of Rome series, Antony and Cleopatra (2007), as a child. Emphasising her as a highly intelligent child, the focus is chiefly on her education, which Octavian purposefully ensures is "like a man's".
Michelle Moran's novel, Cleopatra's Daughter (2009), which focuses on Cleopatra Selene, Queen Cleopatra VII's daughter, depicts a teenage Julia as one of the main characters.

Film and television
In the 1976 BBC Television adaptation of I, Claudius, Julia was portrayed by Frances White.
In the Italian mini series Imperium: Augustus, Julia was portrayed by Vittoria Belvedere. The series focused on the relationship between Augustus and Julia as he recounts how he came to power to her. After being forced into an abusive marriage with Tiberius by her father and Livia, she begins an affair with Iullus Antonius. He subsequently attempts to murder Augustus in order to free Julia from his dynastic plans, leading to her exile.
In the film, The Robe, she was played by Rosalind Ivan, making an anachronistic appearance as Tiberius' wife.
In the 2021 TV series Domina, she was portrayed by Liah O'Prey.

Role in Anno Domini chronology
In 1605, the Polish historian Laurentius Suslyga published a tract (later quoted by Kepler), which for the first time suggested that Jesus was born sometime during the years 6-4 BC, not on 25 December 1 BC as Dionysius Exiguus implied, but never stated. According to Dionysius' dating scheme, the Christian era supposedly began on 1 January AD 1, about one week after Jesus' birth at the end of December. Julia's expulsion from Rome in 2 BC was featured in Suslyga's chronological argument which sought to establish Herod's death in 4 BC. Suslyga's chronological ideas concerning the dating of Herod's death based on Julia the Elder's exile have since been challenged by archaeologists.

Marriages and births
25 BC, Marcellus, until his death in September 23 BC. No children.
21 BC, Marcus Vipsanius Agrippa, until his death in 12 BC. Their children:
Gaius Caesar in 20 BC
Vipsania Julia (known as Julia the Younger) in c. 19 BC.
Lucius Caesar in 17 BC
 Vipsania Julia Agrippina (known as Agrippina the Elder) in 14 BC (mother of Emperor Caligula) 
Agrippa Postumus in 12 BC (posthumously after Agrippa's death). 
11 BC, Julia marries her stepbrother Tiberius. Their child:
Infant son, (dubbed "Tiberillus" by modern historians), died in infancy.

Ancestry

See also
Julio-Claudian family tree
Lex Julia
Lex Papia Poppaea
Scandal

Notes

References

External links
Julia's wit - Macrobius, Saturnalia 2.5.1-10 
LIVIUS: Articles on ancient history (Julia)
BBC Ancient Roman

39 BC births
14 deaths
1st-century BC Roman women
1st-century BC Romans
1st-century Roman women
Ancient Roman exiles
Augustus
Children of Augustus
Daughters of Roman emperors
Deaths by starvation
Julii Caesares
Wives of Roman emperors
Family of Tiberius